Dorset Road is a major urban arterial road in the outer-eastern suburbs of Melbourne.

Major intersections

|}

References

Roads in Victoria (Australia)
Transport in the City of Maroondah
Transport in the City of Knox